The Gogoro Smartscooter is an electric scooter developed by Gogoro and marketed as the G1 Aluminum Liquid Cooled Permanent Magnet Synchronous Motor. It relies on the Gogoro Energy Network as its power replenishment source. 

The scooter design integrates sensors that collect information such as speed, energy consumption and levels, system failures, as well as scooter falls. The information is relayed to the Gogoro Energy Network and presented to riders via Gogoro mobile apps compatible with Android and IOS smartphones. The Gogoro mobile app also allows for customization of certain settings such as lighting and sound profiles.

Gogoro Scooter models

The gogoro smartscooter has four series of 1, 2, 3 and S Performance.

Gogoro Lite (Discontinued)
This is based on the 1 series.
Product life: 2015-10 to 2017-05
Top speed: 95 km/h
Acceleration: 0 to 50 km/h in 4.0 seconds.
Motor power: 6.4kW @ 4,500 rpm
Maximum torque: 27 Nm @ 0-2,250 rpm
Maximum horsepower: 8.58 hp @ 4,500 rpm
Range: above 100 km when traveling at 40 km/h.

Gogoro 1 (Discountinued)
This is based on the 1 series.
Release date: 2015-01
Top speed: 95 km/h
Acceleration: 0 to 50 km/h in 4.0 seconds.
Motor power: 6.4kW @ 4,500 rpm
Maximum torque: 27 Nm @ 0-2,250 rpm
Maximum horsepower: 8.58 hp @ 4,500 rpm
Range: above 100 km when traveling at 40 km/h.

Gogoro 1 Plus (Discontinued)
This is based on the 1 series.
Release date: 2015-06
Top speed: 95 km/h
Acceleration: 0 to 50 km/h in 4.0 seconds.
Motor power: 6.4kW @ 4,500 rpm
Maximum torque: 27 Nm @ 0-2,250 rpm
Maximum horsepower: 8.58 hp @ 4,500 rpm
Range: above 100 km when traveling at 40 km/h.

Gogoro S1
This is based on the 1 series.
Release date: 2016-10
Top speed: 95 km/h
Acceleration: 0 to 50 km/h in 3.7 seconds.
Motor power: 7.2kW @ 5,000 rpm
Maximum torque: 27 Nm @ 0-2,250 rpm
Maximum horsepower: 9.65 hp @ 5,000 rpm
Range: above 100 km when traveling at 40 km/h.

Gogoro 2 (Discontinued)
This is based on the 2 series.
Release date: 2017-05
Top speed: 90 km/h
Acceleration: 0 to 50 km/h in 4.3 seconds.
Motor power: 6.4kW @ 3,000 rpm
Maximum torque: 25 Nm @ 0-2,250 rpm
Maximum horsepower: 8.58 hp @ 3,000 rpm
Range: above 110 km when traveling at 40 km/h.

Gogoro 2 Plus (Discountinued)
This is based on the 2 series.
Release date: 2017-05
Top speed: 90 km/h
Acceleration: 0 to 50 km/h in 4.3 seconds.
Motor power: 6.4kW @ 3,000 rpm
Maximum torque: 25 Nm @ 0-2,250 rpm
Maximum horsepower: 8.58 hp @ 3,000 rpm
Range: above 110 km when traveling at 40 km/h.

Gogoro 2 Deluxe (Discountinued)
This is based on the 2 series.
Release date: 2018-01-31
Top speed: 90 km/h
Acceleration: 0 to 50 km/h in 4.3 seconds.
Motor power: 6.4kW @ 3,000 rpm
Maximum torque: 25 Nm @ 0-2,250 rpm
Maximum horsepower: 8.58 hp @ 3,000 rpm
Range: above 110 km when traveling at 40 km/h.

Gogoro 2 Delight (Discountinued)
This is based on the 2 series.
Release date: 2018-05-29
Top speed: 88 km/h
Acceleration: 0 to 50 km/h in 4.3 seconds.
Motor power: 6.4kW @ 3,000 rpm
Maximum torque: 25 Nm @ 0-2,250 rpm
Maximum horsepower: 8.58 hp @ 3,000 rpm
Range: above 110 km when traveling at 40 km/h.

Gogoro S2 (Discontinued)
This is based on the 2 series.
Release date: 2018-05-29
Top speed: 92 km/h
Acceleration: 0 to 50 km/h in 3.9 seconds.
Motor power: 7.6kW @ 3,000 rpm
Maximum torque: 26 Nm @ 0-2,250 rpm
Maximum horsepower: 10.18 hp @ 3,000 rpm
Range: above 110 km when traveling at 40 km/h.

Gogoro S2 Café Racer (Discountinued)
This is based on the 2 series.
Release date: 2018-11-06
Top speed: 92 km/h
Acceleration: 0 to 50 km/h in 3.9 seconds.
Motor power: 7.6kW @ 3,000 rpm
Maximum torque: 26 Nm @ 0-2,250 rpm
Maximum horsepower: 10.18 hp @ 3,000 rpm
Range: above 110 km when traveling at 40 km/h.

Gogoro S2 Adventure (Discontinued)
This is based on the 2 series.
Release date: 2018-11-06
Top speed: 92 km/h
Acceleration: 0 to 50 km/h in 4.1 seconds.
Motor power: 7.6kW @ 3,000 rpm
Maximum torque: 26 Nm @ 0-2,250 rpm
Maximum horsepower: 10.18 hp @ 3,000 rpm
Range: above 110 km when traveling at 40 km/h.

Gogoro 2 Rumbler (Discontinued)
This is based on the 2 series.
Release date: 2019-03-13
Top speed: 86 km/h
Acceleration: 0 to 50 km/h in 4.6 seconds.
Motor power: 6.4kW @ 3,000 rpm
Maximum torque: 25 Nm @ 0-2,250 rpm
Maximum horsepower: 8.58 hp @ 3,000 rpm
Range: above 96 km when traveling at 40 km/h.

Gogoro 3 (Discountinued)
Gogoro 3 is a new model series of 3 in gogoro brand.
Release date: 2019-05-08
Price: ~$2,300
Top speed: 82 km/h
Acceleration: 0 to 50 km/h in 4.9 seconds.
Motor power: 6.0kW @ 3,000 rpm
Maximum torque: 22 Nm @ 0-2,500 rpm
Maximum horsepower: 8.04 hp @ 3,000 rpm
Range: above 110 km when traveling at 40 km/h.

Gogoro 3 Plus (Discountinued)
This is based on the 3 series.
Release date: 2019-05-08
Top speed: 86 km/h
Acceleration: 0 to 50 km/h in 4.7 seconds.
Motor power: 6.2kW @ 3,000 rpm
Maximum torque: 23 Nm @ 0-2,500 rpm
Maximum horsepower: 8.31 hp @ 3,000 rpm
Range: above 110 km when traveling at 40 km/h

Gogoro S3 (Discountinued)
This is based on the 3 series.
Release date: 2020-06-23
Top speed: 90 km/h
Acceleration: 0 to 50 km/h in 3.7 seconds.
Motor power: 7.6kW @ 3,000 rpm
Maximum torque: 26 Nm @ 0-2,500 rpm
Maximum horsepower: 10.18 hp @ 3,000 rpm
Range: above 110 km when traveling at 40 km/h

Gogoro Viva
This is based on the Viva series.
Release date: 2019-09-26

Gogoro Viva Mix
This is based on the Viva Mix series.
Release date: 2021-02-23

Gogoro 2 Premium
This is based on the 2 series.
Release date: 2021-04-27

Gogoro Viva XL
This is based on the 3 series.
Release date: 2021-07-14

Gogoro Viva Mix Superfast
This is based on the Viva Mix series.
Release date: 2021-08-17

Gogoro SuperSport
This is based on the 2 series.
Release date: 2022-03-16

Gogoro Delight
This is based on the Viva Mix series.
Release date: 2022-07-14

References

External links
 Gogoro official website
 "Meet Gogoro The Electric Scooter Coming To A Megacity Near You", forbes.com, 5 January 2015
  Greg Kumparak, "After Raising $150 Million In Stealth Mode, What The Heck Is Gogoro?", techcrunch.com, 5 January 2015
 Karissa Bell, "The scooter that could be the future of electric vehicles", mashable.com, 5 January 2015
 Taylor Lorenz, "Mysterious Startup Gogoro Quietly Raises $150 Million For An Electric Scooter You'll Never Have To Plug In", businessinsider.com, 5 January 2015
 Thomas Tamblyn, "This Is An Electric Scooter You’ll Never Need To Charge", Huffingtonpost UK, 5 January 2015
 Katie Fehrenbacher, "Introducing Gogoro, a startup with a consumer energy product for megacities and $100M in funding", gigaom.com, 30 October 2014
  Don Reisinger, "Gogoro preps for CES as it wraps up $100M funding round", cnet.com, 30 October 2014

Electric scooters